White Rock River, a perennial river of the Genoa River catchment, is located just south of the Monaro region of New South Wales, Australia.

Course and features
White Rock River rises within South East Forest National Park, below White Rock Mountain, northeast of Rockton and flows generally south and then south southwest before reaching its confluence with the Genoa River, south of Tallawalla. The river descends  over its  course.

The Monaro Highway is situated adjacent to the river in its lower reaches; and the river is crossed by the Imlay Road near Nungatta.

See also

 Rivers of New South Wales
 List of rivers of New South Wales (L–Z)
 List of rivers of Australia

References

External links
 

 

Rivers of New South Wales
South Coast (New South Wales)